Kintsvisi may refer to:

Kintsvisi Monastery
Kintsvisi, Georgia